Lianjiang/Lienchiang may refer to:

Lianjiang County, Fuzhou, Fujian, China (PRC)
Lienchiang County, also the Matsu Islands, Fujian Province, Republic of China (Taiwan)
Lianjiang, Guangdong, county-level city of Zhanjiang, Guangdong
Lianjiang, Anhui (zh), town in and subdivision of Dingyuan County, Anhui
Lianjiang, Jiangxi (zh), town in and subdivision of Xingguo County, Jiangxi